Mount McGee is a mountain,  high, rising from a ridge at the north side of Clausnitzer Glacier in the Random Hills of Victoria Land, Antarctica. It was mapped by the United States Geological Survey from surveys and U.S. Navy air photos, 1955–63, and was named by the Advisory Committee on Antarctic Names for Lawrence E. McGee, a geologist at McMurdo Station in the 1965–66 summer season.

References

Mountains of Victoria Land
Borchgrevink Coast